Tulla is a parish in County Clare and part of the Ceantar na Lochanna grouping of parishes within the Roman Catholic Diocese of Killaloe.

, the co-parish priest is Brendan Quinlivan.

The main church of the parish is the Church of Saints Peter and Paul in Tulla, built in 1832-1837. The building was renovated in 1971, receiving a far more modest exterior. It was rededicated by bishop Harty. 

The second church of the parish is the Church of Immaculate Conception in Drumcharley. This church was built in 1838-1839 and was during construction severely damaged in the Night of the Big Wind. The third church is the St. James's Church in Knockjames, built in the period 1882-1884.

References

Parishes of the Roman Catholic Diocese of Killaloe